Juergen Teller (born 28 January 1964) is a German fine-art and fashion photographer. He was awarded the Citibank Prize for Photography in 2003 and received the Special Presentation International Center of Photography Infinity Award in 2018.

Major solo exhibitions of his work have been organised at Fondation Cartier pour l’art Contemporain, Paris (2006); Le Consortium, Dijon, France (2010); Dallas Contemporary, TX (2011); Daelim Museum, Seoul (2011); Institute of Contemporary Art, London (2013); Contemporary Fine Arts, Berlin (2015); Kunsthalle Bonn, Germany (2016),  Garage Museum of Contemporary Art, Moscow (2018). Self-portraiture has been a prominent feature of his practice and was the main focus of his 'Macho' exhibition at DESTE Foundation, Athens, Greece (2014).

Education
Teller studied at the Bayerische Staatslehranstalt für Photographie in Munich, Germany (1984–1986). In order to avoid military national service he learned English and moved to London in 1986, aged 22.

Career
Since the beginning his career in the late 1980s, Teller has blurred the boundaries between his commissioned and personal work in his numerous campaigns, editorials, publications and exhibitions. Teller treats all of his subjects — family members, celebrities, and himself with a uniform style of grit, raw emotion and humour that has become his iconic and recognizable aesthetic.

His photographs have appeared in Arena Homme +, The Face, i-D, 032c, Pop, Purple, Self Service, W, Vogue (American, Australian, British, French, Italian, Japanese, Polish) and Zeit magazin among others. He photographed Kylie Minogue for the artwork of her 1991 album Let's Get to It. Teller first gained wider recognition in 1996 with his front cover of Süddeutsche Zeitung Magazine featuring a nude Kristen McMenamy with the word ‘Versace’ drawn in a heart across her chest.

In 1997, Marc Jacobs worked with Teller's then-partner, Venetia Scott to style his collections and Teller shot Kim Gordon from Sonic Youth for the Spring Summer 1998 campaign. 

For the brand's 2005 campaign, he photographed himself with Cindy Sherman and also collaborated with Winona Ryder, Sofia Coppola, Helena Bonham Carter, Michael Stipe, Rufus Wainwright and Harmony Korine amongst others until the SS2014 campaign. Teller has also collaborated with a range of other designers and fashion houses during his career, including Helmut Lang, Yves Saint Laurent, Vivienne Westwood, Céline, Missoni, Moschino, Barney's, Louis Vuitton, Adidas, Palace and Valentino.

Teller has photographed many celebrities, musicians, artists and photographers, including Arnold Schwarzenegger, O. J. Simpson, Kurt Cobain, Bjork, Kate Moss, Elton John, Pelé, David Hockney, Roni Horn, Sarah Lucas, William Eggleston, Boris Mikhailov and Araki Nobuyoshi. He photographed American rapper Kanye West for T: The New York Times Style Magazine and shot the 'Kanye, Juergen and Kim' supplement for System featuring Kanye West and Kim Kardashian as well as himself in 2015. The actress Charlotte Rampling has been a long term collaborator, appearing in Teller's Louis XV series which was exhibited at Contemporary Fine Arts, Berlin and published by Steidl as a book in 2005, and the Paradis photographs shot at Musée du Louvre in 2009.

Teller has directed several fashion films, short films and artist videos including Can I Own Myself (1998), Go-Sees (2001), World Cup Final, Germany 0 Brazil 2 London (2002), Schmetterling''' (2005) and Dieter (2017).

Teaching
Teller was Professor of Photography at the Academy of Fine Arts in Nuremberg from 2014 to 2019.

Curating
In 2016, Teller curated an exhibition of Robert Mapplethorpe's photographs at Alison Jacques Gallery in London where he selected 58 images from the Mapplethorpe Foundation collection.

Personal life
Teller was married to UK contemporary art dealer Sadie Coles from 2003 to 2018.
Teller married Dovile Drizyte in 2021.

PublicationsJuergen Teller. Cologne: Taschen, 1996Der verborgene Brecht. Ein Berliner Stadtrundgang. Zurich: Scalo, 1998Go-Sees: Girls Knocking on My Door. Zurich: Scalo, 1999. .Remake Berlin. Steidl Verlag, Fotomuseum Winterthur, Bank Hofmann AG, 1999Tracht.Göttingen: Steidl/Lehmann Maupin Gallery, 2001More. Göttingen: Steidl, 2001Märchenstüberl. Göttingen: Steidl, 2002Zwei Schäuferle mit Kloß und eine Kinderportion Schnitzel mit Pommes Frites. Göttingen: Steidl, 2003Nackig auf dem Fußballplatz. Göttingen: Steidl, 2003Louis XV. Göttingen: Steidl, 2004Ich bin Vierzig. Göttingen: Steidl, 2004The Master. Göttingen: Steidl, 2004Ohne Titel. Göttingen: Steidl, 2005Nürnberg. Göttingen: Steidl, 2006Ed in Japan. Paris: Purple publications, 2006Jürgen Teller, Do You Know What I Mean. Exhibition catalogue. Paris: Foundation Cartier pour l'art contemporain/London-New York: Thames & Hudson, 2006Juergen Teller Vivienne Westwood, Spring Summer 2008. Göttingen: Steidl, 2008Election Day, Vivienne Westwood, Spring Summer 2009. Göttingen: Steidl, 2009Juergen Teller: Marc Jacobs Advertising 1997-2008. Göttingen: Steidl, 2008The Master II. Göttingen: Steidl, 2010Zimmermann. Göttingen: Steidl, 2010The Deste Foundation Collection. Göttingen: Steidl, 2010Get a Life, Vivienne Westwood Spring Summer 2010. Göttingen: Steidl, 2010Calves and Thighs. TF Editore, 2010Touch Me. Reel, 2011Hotel Il Pellicano. Italy: Slim Arons, John Swope, Juergen Teller, Rizzoli 2011Common Ground. Marsilio Editoria, 2012
The Keys to the House. Göttingen: Steidl, 2012
Pictures and Text Göttingen: Steidl, 2012
The Master III Göttingen: Steidl, 2012
Woo! Juergen Teller Steidl and ICA, 2013
Eating at Hotel Il Pellicano. Violette Editions, 2013
Kolkata. The Juergen Teller Purple Book, Purple Institute, 2014
I'm Fifty. Suzanne Tarasieve, Paris, 2014
Araki Teller, Teller Araki., Eyesencia, 2014. With Nobuyoshi Araki
I Just Arrived in Paris. (Louis Vuitton AW2014), Göttingen: Steidl, 2014
Siegerflieger Göttingen: Steidl, 2015
The Flow. (Louis Vuitton SS2015), Göttingen: Steidl, 2015
Season Three. (Louis Vuitton AW2015), Göttingen: Steidl, 2015
The Clinic. Contemporary Fine Arts, Berlin, 2015
Mit dem Teller nach Bonn. Steidl/Bundeskunsthalle, 2016
Boris Mikhailov, Parliament. Rodovid, Kyiv, Ukraine, 2017
Vivienne Westwood, Andreas Kronthaler, Juergen Teller. In Other Words, 2017Leg, Snails and Peaches. Suzanne Tarasieve, Paris, 2018
The Master IV. Göttingen: Steidl, 2019
Handbags. Göttingen: Steidl, 2019
Mmm!. Göttingen: Steidl, 2019
TELLER ABLOH. Fine Print/Prestel, 2019
50 Times Bonami and Obrist. Göttingen: Steidl, 2019
Plumtree Court. Göttingen: Steidl, 2020
Leben und Tod: Nobuyoshi Araki and Juergen Teller. Göttingen: Steidl, 2020
The Nipple, Annual Series No.7. Oakland California: TBW, 2020
William Eggleston 414. Göttingen: Steidl, 2020. With Harmony Korine. .
Donkey Man and Other Stories. New York: Rizzoli, 2021. .
Auguri. Göttingen: Steidl, 2022. With Dovile Drizyte. .
Notes About My Work. Göttingen: Steidl, 2022. .
The Master V. Göttingen: Steidl, 2022. .

Awards
2003: Citibank Prize for Photography
2018: Special Presentation, International Center of Photography Infinity Award

Exhibitions

Solo exhibitions

1998	Juergen Teller, The Photographers' Gallery, London
2002	Märchenstüberl, Münchner Stadtmuseum, Germany
2002	Märchenstüberl, Museum Folkwang, Essen, Germany
2003	Märchenstüberl, Galleria d'Arte Moderna, Bologna, Italy
2003	Märchenstüberl, Frans Hals Museum, Haarlem, Netherlands
2003	Tracht, Kunsthalle Mannheim, Mannheim, Germany
2004	Go-sees and World cup Final, Germany v Brazil 0-2 Temple Bar Visual Arts, Dublin, Ireland
2004	Ich bin Vierzig, Kunsthalle Wien, Vienna, Austria
2006	Do You Know What I Mean, Fondation Cartier pour l'Art Contemporain, Paris
2007	Awailable, Inverleith House, Edinburgh, Scotland
2009	Teller, Frans Hals Museum, Haarlem, Netherlands
2009	Logisch, Kunsthalle Nürnberg, Germany
2010	Touch Me, Le Consortium, Dijon, France
2011	Man with Banana, Dallas Contemporary, US
2011	Texte und Bilder, Moscow House of Photography, Russia
2011	Texte und Bilder, Brukenthal National Museum, Sibiu, Romania
2012	Bilder und Texte, Embassy of the Federal Republic of Germany, London, UK
2013   Woo!, Institute of Contemporary Arts, London
2014	Bus Stops, Strand, London
2014	Macho, Deste Foundation, Athens, Greece
2016	Enjoy Your Life!, Bundeskunsthalle, Bonn, Germany
2016	Enjoy Your Life!, Galerie Rudolfinum, Prague, Czech Republic 
2017	Enjoy Your Life!, Martin-Gropius-Bau, Berlin, Germany
2017 	Juergen Teller, Germany
2017	Juergen Teller, Great Arch Hall, Photo London, Somerset House, London
2018	Enjoy Your Life!, Fotomuseum Winterthur, Switzerland
2018   Zittern auf dem Sofa, Garage Museum of Contemporary Art, Moscow, Russia
2019 Handbags, Museo Villa Pignatelli, Naples, Italy
2019 Heimweh, Konig Tokio x MCM Ginza Haus I, Tokyo
2021 What Are We Talking About?, T-10, Beijing, China

Curated exhibitions
2016 	Teller on Mapplethorpe, Alison Jacques Gallery, London

Selected Group exhibitions
Citibank Photography Prize, The Photographers Gallery, London (2003)
The Kate Show, The Foam Museum, Amsterdam, Netherlands (2006)
2007: represented Ukraine as one of five artists in the 52nd Venice Biennale
Street & Studio: An Urban History of Photography, Tate Modern, London (2008)
Not in Fashion, MMK Museum, Frankfürt, Germany (2010)
Night in Twilight: Art from Romanticism to the Present, Belvedere Museum, Vienna, Austria (2012)
Riotous Baroque, Kunsthaus Zurich, Switzerland (2012), toured to Guggenheim, Bilbao, Spain (2013)
Paparazzi! Photographers, Stars and Artists, Centre Pompidou, Metz, France (2014)
Faces Now: European Portrait Photography Since 1990, BOZAR Centre for Fine Arts, Brussels, toured to Nederlands Fotomuseum, Rotterdam, and National Museum of Photography, Thessaloniki, Greece (2015-2016)
VOGUE 100: A Century of Style, National Portrait Gallery, London and Manchester Art Gallery (2016)
La Vie Simple - Simplement la Vie, Fondation Vincent van Gogh, Arles, France (2017)
Icons of Style: A Century of Fashion Photography 1911-2011, J. Paul Getty Museum, Los Angeles, USA (2018)
The Exhausted Man, Swiss National Museum, Zurich, Switzerland (2020)
E/Motion. Fashion in Transition, MoMu Fashion Museum Antwerp, Belgium (2021)
Captivate! Fashion Photography from the 1990s. Curated by Claudia Schiffer, Kunstpalast, Dusseldorf, Germany (2021)
Vogue Paris-100 years-1920-2020, Palais Galliera, Paris, France (2021)

Collections
Teller's work is held in the following permanent collections:
Centre Pompidou, Paris
Fondation Cartier pour l'Art Contemporain, Paris
Museum für Moderne Kunst, Frankfurt
National Portrait Gallery, London: 3 prints (as of January 2021)
Victoria and Albert Museum, London: 4 prints (as of January 2021)

References

External links
 
 Steidl Artist Page
 Interview with Business of Fashion
 Interview with Nowness
 Interview with ShowStudio
 Interview with System magazine

1964 births
Living people
Photographers from Bavaria
Fashion photographers
German contemporary artists
Academic staff of the Academy of Fine Arts, Nuremberg
People from Erlangen
Photographers from London
German expatriates in the United Kingdom
Fine art photographers